Little Rock is an unincorporated community in Little Rock Township, Kendall County, Illinois. It is located in the far northwestern corner of the county. Big Rock lies to the northeast, Hinckley lies to the northwest, Plano lies to the southeast, and Sandwich lies to the south of the village.

The community originated as a stagecoach stop along Galena Road (also known as Chicago Road to the west of Little Rock). The community is named for Little Rock Creek, which flows on the community's western side.

References

1836 establishments in Illinois
Populated places established in 1836
Unincorporated communities in Illinois
Unincorporated communities in Kendall County, Illinois